Georg Riedlsperger (born 6 May 1969) is an Austrian skier. He competed in the Nordic combined event at the 1994 Winter Olympics.

References

External links
 

1969 births
Living people
Austrian male Nordic combined skiers
Olympic Nordic combined skiers of Austria
Nordic combined skiers at the 1994 Winter Olympics
People from St. Johann im Pongau District
Sportspeople from Salzburg (state)